Wraith Games, originally known as Mind's Eye Games, is a video game developer based in Hamilton, Ohio. Founded in March 2005 by Jay Kidd, the company is known for creating the puzzle game Collapsus.

In 2009, Wraith Games was added to GamePro Magazine's GamePro Labs video game publishing arm for their game Physix. As of 2016, Physix has yet to be released, though as of 2015, Wraith Games has announced that the game is still in active development, although with a shifted focus toward virtual reality.

The company made its first full release, the Kongregate exclusive FlyGuy in December 2011. In April 2012, the company announced that FlyGuy would be released on iOS and Android OS although, as of 2016, this release has yet to surface.

In 2015, their third game, Collapsus, was nominated for SlideDB (part of Indie DB)'s "App of the Year" awards making it into the Top 50. In 2016, Collapsus would go on to reach 4th place in the award's "Top Upcoming" category.

It was first shown to the public when Wraith Games attended the Ohio Game Development Expo in 2015. When they returned in 2016, site CLE Tech named Collapsus as one of their "Top Picks" for the show.  Collapsus was also showcased at Game Masters (exhibition) when it arrived at COSI Columbus in June 2016.

Collapsus is notable for its unique resource management mechanic where "breaks" are lost by making clicks and regained by creating columns or rows of four or more same colored blocks; as well as for the player's ability to rotate the device, controlling the way the blocks on screen fall.

According to The AbleGamers Foundation, Collapsus has "some of the fundamental building blocks of accessibility". The game is fully colorblind accessible, featuring different modes to cater to different types of colorblindness and can even be played in full black and white. As of 2016, Wraith Games has begun giving talks on the subject of accessibility in video games.

In 2016, Wraith Games contributed to the Kentucky Fried Pixels game jam and game bundle with their game, Radarkanoid, along with 19 other developers. 50% of the profits went to Louisville Makes Games, a 501(c) organization dedicated to promoting game development as a career option in the Kentucky region.

Games

Web 

 FlyGuy (2011)
 Radarkanoid (2016)

References

External links 
 

American companies established in 2005
Companies based in Ohio
Video game companies of the United States
Video game development companies